The Cane River is a river in the Pilbara region of Western Australia.

The headwaters of the river rise west of the Hamersley Range.

The river is considered to be dendritic with no major tributaries, numerous wells exist within the catchment area. The river has one large permanent pool, Jabaddar Pool which is located downstream from the North West Coastal Highway.

The mouth of the river is a largely unmodified estuary that works as a function of tidal energy. The estuary covers a total area of  that is mostly saltmarsh but with a small colony of mangroves.

The river was named in 1866 by the explorer Harry Venn who later was a member of the Forrest Ministry. He named the river after Charles Cane who was a member of Venn's expedition.

The waters have an average salinity of 90 mg/L and turbidity of 335 NTU.

The river has a large delta that is situated within the boundaries of Peedamulla Station. The river delta had become degraded as a result overgrazing particularly prior to 1970 when the station was running 100,000 head of sheep.

References

Rivers of the Pilbara region